Department of Conservation and Natural Resources may refer to:

 Alabama Department of Conservation and Natural Resources
 Nevada Department of Conservation and Natural Resources
 Pennsylvania Department of Conservation and Natural Resources